Four ships of the Royal Navy have borne the name HMS Resistance. A fifth was planned but never built:

  was a 44-gun fifth rate launched in 1782, which blew up on 24 July 1798 in the Strait of Banca, South West Sumatra in an unexplained ammunition explosion.
  was a 36-gun fifth rate launched in 1801 and wrecked in 1803.
  was a 38-gun fifth rate launched in 1805. She was converted into a troopship in 1842 and was broken up in 1858.
  was a  launched in 1861. She was used as a target ship from 1885, and was sold in 1898 but foundered in 1899. She was raised and scrapped in 1900.
She was ordered in 1914, but was cancelled later that year.

Royal Navy ship names